Unión Deportiva Pavía is a football team based in Almería. Founded in July 1955, the team plays in Primera Andaluza.

The club's home ground is Complejo Deportivo Tito Pedro.

Season to season

0 seasons in Tercera División

Current squad

References

External links
Official Website
futbolme.com profile
lapreferente.com profile

Association football clubs established in 1955
Football clubs in Andalusia
Divisiones Regionales de Fútbol clubs
1955 establishments in Spain